Daredevil: The Album is a soundtrack album released on February 4, 2003, by Wind-up Records for the movie Daredevil, starring Ben Affleck. All songs were previously unreleased, and some songs appeared on later releases. Unlike later soundtrack releases, many songs from Daredevil: The Album notably appeared in the film.

The album was one of the first collaborations between Marvel Comics and Wind-up Records, which would continue with the releases of The Punisher, Fantastic Four and the Daredevil sequel/spin-off Elektra. Three singles were released from the album: Fuel's "Won't Back Down", the Calling's "For You", and Evanescence's "Bring Me to Life". Music videos were also made for the 3 singles plus 3 other tracks from the album "Fade Out/In" by Paloalto, "Caught in the Rain" by Revis and "My Immortal" by Evanescence

One of the singles from the movie, "Bring Me to Life" by Evanescence featuring Paul McCoy, won a Grammy Award for Best Hard Rock Performance at the 46th Grammy Awards. The song was nominated in the category for Best Rock Song at the same event but lost to "Seven Nation Army" by The White Stripes. "Bring Me to Life" won an award for Choice Music Rock Track at the Teen Choice Awards in 2004. At the 2003 MTV Video Music Awards the band was nominated in the category for Best New Artist for "Bring Me to Life". The song was nominated at the 2003 MTV Europe Music Awards for Best Song. At the 14th annual Billboard Music Awards, it won the award for Soundtrack Single of the Year. The song ranked number 69 on VH1's 100 Greatest Songs of the 2000s.

Three songs were omitted from release on the album: N.E.R.D.'s "Lapdance", Dara Shindler's "Faraway", and House of Pain's "Top o' the Morning to Ya".

Track listing 
Credits adapted from the album's liner notes.

Other appearances 
 A remix of Fuel's "Won't Back Down" was later released on Natural Selection.
 Seether's "Hang On" appeared on the U.S. version of Disclaimer II.
 "Bring Me to Life" and "My Immortal" were originally recorded for Evanescence's debut album Fallen, which was released a month after the soundtrack.
 Nickelback's "Learn the Hard Way" appeared as a bonus track on The Long Road.
 Revis' "Caught in the Rain" was originally recorded for their debut album, Places for Breathing, though this album did not see release until three months after the soundtrack.
 BoySetsFire's "High Wire Escape Artist" appeared on their third album, Tomorrow Come Today, a few weeks after the soundtrack.
 "Simple Lies" later appeared on Endo's second album Songs for the Restless in July 2003.

Charts

Weekly charts

Year-end charts

Certifications

References

External links 
Official soundtrack

Daredevil (film series)
Marvel Comics film soundtracks
2003 soundtrack albums
2000s film soundtrack albums
Wind-up Records soundtracks
Post-grunge albums
Nu metal albums

Daredevil (film)